New Hampshire Route 12 is a  long north-south state highway in southwestern New Hampshire. Its southern terminus is at the Massachusetts state line in Fitzwilliam, where it continues south as Massachusetts Route 12. Its northern terminus is at the Vermont state line in Claremont (a terminus it shares with New Hampshire Route 103), where it continues north as Vermont Route 12. Most of the northern part of NH 12 runs along the Connecticut River.

Its number is derived from its original 1922 designation as New England Interstate Route 12 (also known as the "Keene Way"). Present-day Vermont Route 12, New Hampshire Route 12, Massachusetts Route 12 and Connecticut Route 12 still mostly follow the original route. The  four-state series of State Route 12s extend from Morrisville, Vermont, to Groton, Connecticut.

Route description

Fitzwilliam to Keene 
NH 12 begins in Fitzwilliam where it connects to Massachusetts Route 12 at the state line. The highway heads northwest into the town center where it crosses NH 119. NH 12 continues northwest through Troy, then dips into parts of Marlborough and Swanzey before entering the city of Keene. Immediately after crossing into Keene, NH 12 intersects the northern terminus of NH 32 then meets NH 101 near Keene State College. NH 12 turns west along NH 101, then meets NH 10 at a roundabout. NH 10 joins NH 12 and NH 101 west to the next intersection at NH 9. NH 101 ends while NH 10 and NH 12 turn north with NH 9 eastbound in tow. NH 9 and NH 10 split off at a trumpet interchange while NH 12 continues northwest. The highway interchanges with NH 12A on its way out of town.

Surry to Charlestown 
NH 12 enters the southwestern corner of Surry, then turns nearly due west, crossing into the town of Westmoreland. It intersects the northern terminus of NH 63 near the Connecticut River, then turns north and enters Walpole. Now paralleling the eastern bank of the river, NH 12 heads north towards the town center. It intersects with NH 123, which connects to U.S. Route 5 in the neighboring town of Westminster, Vermont. NH 123 south joins NH 12 north and the two routes run in a wrong-way concurrency until crossing the Cold River, where NH 123 splits off to the east. NH 12 continues north along the river and crosses into Charlestown where it meets the northern terminus of NH 12A. The highway continues through downtown, then intersects NH 11, which connects to Interstate 91 and US 5 in nearby Springfield, Vermont. NH 11 east joins NH 12 north and the two routes continue north. A second, northern segment of NH 12A splits off to bypass Claremont while NH 11 and NH 12 head towards the downtown area.

Claremont 
In downtown Claremont NH 11 and NH 12 intersect with NH 103 and split after a  overlap. Facilitated by a traffic circle, NH 11 joins NH 103 eastbound while NH 12 joins NH 103 westbound. NH 12 and NH 103 cross the Sugar River, then parallel it to the northwest (which they do for the remainder of their lengths) back towards the Connecticut River. Heading west, NH 12 and NH 103 cross NH 12A, then turn northwest and cross the river into Ascutney, Vermont. NH 103 ends at the state line while NH 12 becomes Vermont Route 12.

History

NH 12 was originally designated in 1922 as part of New England Interstate Route 12, a  regional highway stretching from Route 1 (modern U.S. Route 1, which partly runs on Interstate 95) in New London, Connecticut, to Derby, Vermont, where it terminated at Route 2 (modern U.S. Route 5) near the border with Quebec. It was known as the "Keene Way," reflecting its route through Keene, New Hampshire.

In 1926, the New England road marking system was usurped by the system of United States Numbered Highways and in ca. 1932, Route 12 was redesignated as state highways bearing the number 12 (although a portion of Route 12 in southern Connecticut swapped designations with Route 32 at the same time). In the 1960s, VT 12 was truncated from Derby to its present terminus in Morrisville, with the former highway remaining as parts of VT 14, VT 16 and US 5. The highway as a whole has remained largely unchanged since.

Junction list

New Hampshire Route 12A

New Hampshire Route 12A is a designation held by two state highways which bypass separate sections of NH 12. Although not directly connected, the two segments are linked by an  section of NH 12 in Charlestown.

Southern segment

The southern segment of NH 12A is a  loop route of NH 12 which bypasses Westmoreland and Walpole. Its southern terminus is at an interchange with NH 12 in Keene. Its northern terminus is at an intersection with NH 12 in Charlestown.

This section of NH 12A begins at an interchange with NH 12 north of downtown Keene. The highway initially heads northeast, then turns north to parallel the Ashuelot River and enters the town of Surry. NH 12A passes through the center of Surry and continues north into Alstead. In Alstead, NH 12A continues north until intersecting with NH 123. NH 12A joins NH 123 and the highway intersects NH 123A before turning west along the Cold River. The road turns north to cross the river, then NH 12A splits from NH 123. NH 12A continues northwest through the town of Langdon before crossing into Charlestown. NH 12A terminates at NH 12 in the southern end of town.

Northern segment

Its southern terminus is at an intersection with NH 11 and NH 12 in Charlestown. Its northern terminus is at US 4 and NH 10 in Lebanon.

This section of NH 12A starts in northern Charlestown where it splits from NH 11 / NH 12. It runs along the eastern side of the Connecticut River, bypassing downtown Claremont to the west. After crossing the Sugar River, NH 12A crosses NH 12 and NH 103, which cross into Ascutney, Vermont, just to the west. 

Now paralleling its parent route, which has become Vermont Route 12 across the river, NH 12A continues north into the town of Cornish. Bridge Street offers a local connection to VT 12, US 5 and VT 44 in neighboring Windsor, Vermont. NH 12A continues through western Plainfield without any major junctions, then enters the city of Lebanon. NH 12A continues north and interchanges with Interstate 89 before terminating at US 4 / NH 10 in West Lebanon village.

Related routes
 New England Interstate Route 12, the designation carried by NH 12 in the 1920s

See also
 
 List of state highways in New Hampshire

References

External links

 New Hampshire State Route 12 on Flickr
 New Hampshire State Route 12A on Flickr
 Old New Hampshire State Route 12A on Flickr

012
Transportation in Sullivan County, New Hampshire
Transportation in Cheshire County, New Hampshire
Keene, New Hampshire
Charlestown, New Hampshire
Claremont, New Hampshire